Ellen Ann Brathwaite Stryker Sandimanie was a Liberian city official. She was an ordained Presbyterian minister and the first woman mayor of Monrovia. She represented Liberia at an international gatherings of Presbyterian women in the 1960s and 1970s.

Early life 
Ellen Ann Brathwaite was born in Liberia, part of a large Americo-Liberian family. She graduated from Liberia College and earned a diploma from Monrovia Bible Institute.

Career 
In 1961, Sandimanie toured the United States for several months, attending the annual General Assembly of the United Presbyterian Church in the U.S.A. in Buffalo, New York, the triennial meeting of United Presbyterian Women in Lafayette, Indiana, and lecturing at churches and women's groups. She also represented Liberian women at international meetings in Brussels and in Accra.

In 1966 Sandimanie was ordained as a Presbyterian minister in Liberia, and served two rural churches, in Marshall and Fansehn Town. She was also president of the Presbyterian Women of Liberia.

Sandimanie was deputy mayor of Monrovia in 1965. President William Tubman appointed Sandimanie as Mayor-Commissioner of Monrovia in 1970. "I realize the job is a challenge to my sex, so I work hard to justify my appointment, to prove women are capable," she said. She visited the United States again in 1972, touring Washington, D.C., Richmond, Virginia, and other cities. She received the key to the city of Montclair, New Jersey, and met Sammy Davis Jr.  She made another lecture tour in the United States in 1980.

Personal life 
Ellen Ann Brathwaite married twice. Her first husband was Richard Stryker, a carpenter. They had two sons, Jehu T. Stryker and H. Victor Stryker, before he died. Her second husband was Boymah Y. Sandimanie II, an engineer. In addition to her sons, she raised eight foster children.

References 

Americo-Liberian people
Mayors of Monrovia
Liberian Presbyterians
Presbyterian ministers
University of Liberia alumni
Women mayors of places in Liberia
20th-century Liberian politicians
20th-century Liberian women politicians